Cobb is an unincorporated community in Sumter County, Georgia, United States. Cobb is connected with the residents of Lake Blackshear and is the location of the Lake Blackshear Volunteer Fire Department.

The community is part of the Americus Micropolitan Statistical Area.

External links
Cobb, Georgia GA Community Profile: City Data, Resources, Demographics
Official Georgia Tourism page

References

Unincorporated communities in Georgia (U.S. state)
Unincorporated communities in Sumter County, Georgia
Americus, Georgia micropolitan area